Nanquidno is a hamlet near St Just in Penwith in west Cornwall, England. It is about half a mile southwest of Kelynack.

References

Hamlets in Cornwall